Conrad Uno is an American record producer and founder of the independent record label PopLlama Records. Uno began his career making his own music as a teenager in his makeshift basement studio. At the request of his friends, the Young Fresh Fellows, Uno produced their debut album The Fabulous Sounds of the Pacific Northwest. When the band decided to release their debut album themselves, Uno founded PopLlama Records to help with the release. He would also produce their next four albums; Topsy Turvey (1985), The Men Who Loved Music (1987), Totally Lost (1988) and This One's for the Ladies (1989), the latter three released through Frontier Records. He would also produce albums by Dharma Bums, Haywire: Out Through the Indoor (1989), and Scott McCaughey, My Chartreuse Opinion (1989), while he was the engineer on Mudhoney's self-titled album released in 1989.

In the 1990s, Uno would produce albums for Mudhoney, their Sub Pop releases Every Good Boy Deserves Fudge (1991), Piece of Cake (1992) and their 1994 collaboration with Jimmie Dale Gilmore Buckskin Stallion Blues, and The Presidents of the United States of America, their 1994 debut self-titled album. Piece of Cake peaked at number 189 on the Billboard 200 while The Presidents' debut album would be re-released on Columbia Records the following year, peaking at number 6 on the Billboard 200 and later being certified double-platinum by the Recording Industry Association of America.

Credits

References

External links 
 
 

Year of birth missing (living people)
Living people
Place of birth missing (living people)
Record producers from Washington (state)
Musicians from Seattle
20th-century American singers
21st-century American singers